Queensland Telugu Association (QTA) Queensland Telugu Association (QTA) is a non-profit organization dedicated to Telugu culture and to bring unity among Telugu speaking community of Queensland. QTA was formed on 21 June 2008 and was formally registered as a non-profit organisation in Brisbane by immigrant Telugu people in Brisbane.QTA evolved into a medium of promoting the Telugu culture, education and the community affairs and activities. QTA is a member of FICQ, the umbrella association covering most Indian ethnic associations in Queensland.Telugu is an ancient South Indian language spoken in the states of Andhra Pradesh, Telangana, and also in neighbouring states such as Tamil Nadu, and Karnataka in India, and could be considered as a Dravidian language.  Telugu is spoken by at least 75 million people world-wide and constitutes 15th most spoken language world-wide. Telugu community in QLD is growing very rapidly and it is estimated that there are around 500 families with Telugu background within Brisbane and QLD. In addition, overseas student population with Telugu background is also growing rapidly. QTA organised its very first cultural event “Annamayya Aradhana” on 6th Sep 2008, at Sree Laxmi Narayan Temple, at Burbank, QLD. Participation came from Telugu, Tamil, Kannada, and various other groups who celebrated the 600th birthday of Saint Annamacharya.As the number of families and student numbers increased, Telugu community members started gathering for social occasions like Ugadi (Telugu New Year), Dasara and Deepawali.

Apart from these activities QTA also airs Telugu programs on air on regional radio channels in Brisbane with Telugulahari (Queensland’s first Telugu Radio) for few hours every weekend. Telugu Lahari - is a community radio group based in Brisbane, Australia. This group was formed by a minute group of families and friends with a Telugu background in Brisbane. On 7 September 2005 it had broadcast its very first program. This program is highly popular with the Telugu community across age groups from Kids to Seniors.

References

External links 
 QTA Official Website
 QTA in Queensland Local News
 FICQ /
 QTA in Queensland Government Events calendar
 QTA in Singh.com.au
 QTA in High Commission of India in Australia
 QTA in LocalNews 
 QTA in OurCommunity

Organisations based in Queensland